Christians are a minority in the Inner Mongolia region of the People's Republic of China. There are Eastern Orthodox Churches in Labdarin, Manzhou, and Hailar. The Shouters are active in Inner Mongolia.

About 100,000 Chinese Christians were in the region in 1993.
The region has few Mongolian Christians. 

Numerous house church leaders were detained in Xilinhot in 2008.
Inner Mongolia is an area of rapid growth of Protestantism. 
 
Religious Affairs Bureau staff have declared a Christmas gathering in Duolun County illegal in 2006. 
Inner Mongolia Bible School (formerly Inner Mongolia Training Class) was founded in 1987.
Inner Mongolia has more than 170,000 Protestants and over 1,000 official churches.
Tongsun Street Church was started with the help of Swedish missionaries around 1900. 
According to Tjalling Halbertsma, Christians used to live in Inner Mongolia before 1206. 

Hohhot used to have or has a very large house church with more than 1500 church members. Protestantism entered the region in the late 19th century. Due to the Dungan Revolt (1895–96), the western Inner Mongolian Han Chinese Catholic village Xiaoqiaopan had defensive procedures instituted by the Belgian Priests in charge. Missionaries were killed during the Boxer Rebellion in 1900. The French Catholic vicar apostolic, Msgr. Alfons Bermyn, wanted foreign troops garrisoned in inner Mongolia, but the Governor refused. Bermyn petitioned the Manchu Enming to send troops to Hetao where Prince Duan's Mongol troops and General Dong Fuxiang's Muslim troops allegedly threatened Catholics. It turned out that Bermyn had created the incident as a hoax. In Fengzhen, a church was founded as early as 1892. Most Christians in Inner Mongolia are Han Chinese.

Catholicism
Its priest tried to prevent the demolition of the only Catholic church of Ordos and was arrested. 
 
A Roman Catholic Archdiocese of Suiyuan, a Roman Catholic Diocese of Chifeng, and a Roman Catholic Diocese of Jining exist. 
Inner Mongolia has Catholic villages. 
 It has an illegal Catholic seminary. Several priests of the illegal Catholic Church had been arrested in 2007. 
 
There are also more than 200,000 Catholics in Inner Mongolia. The Roman Catholic church has a history of over 120 years. There are at least 32 Catholic churches and 100 home meetings. During the Boxer Rebellion, more than 2000 Catholics were murdered in Inner Mongolia. 
Four bishops appointed by the Chinese Patriotic Catholic Association are present in Inner Mongolia.

See also 
 Christianity in Mongolia
 Christianity among the Mongols
 Christianity in Inner Mongolia's neighbouring provinces
 Christianity in Hebei
 Christianity in Heilongjiang
 Christianity in Jilin
 Christianity in Liaoning
 Christianity in Shaanxi

References 

Religion in Inner Mongolia
Christianity in China by location